AOAC International is a 501(c) non-profit scientific association with headquarters in Rockville, Maryland. It was founded in 1884 as the Association of Official Agricultural Chemists (AOAC) and became AOAC International in 1991. It publishes standardized, chemical analysis methods designed to increase confidence in the results of chemical and microbiological analyses. Government agencies and civil organizations often require that laboratories use official AOAC methods. AOAC is headquartered in Rockville, Maryland, and has approximately 3,000 members based in over 90 countries.

History
AOAC International, informally the AOAC, was founded September 8, 1884, as the Association of Official Agricultural Chemists, by the United States Department of Agriculture (USDA), to establish uniform chemical analysis methods for analyzing fertilizers. In 1927, sponsorship was moved to the newly formed Food, Drug and Insecticide organization which become the Food and Drug Administration (FDA) in 1930.

From its initial scope of analyzing fertilizer, the organization expanded the contents of its methods book to cover dairy products, pesticides, microbiological contamination and animal feeds, among others. In 1965, due to its increasing area of focus for analytical work, the name was changed to the Association of Official Analytical Chemists. The name was changed again to the Association of Analytical Communities to reflect the growing international involvement, and then in 1991 it became AOAC International, with AOAC no longer having any legal meaning. Control of the organization remained with the FDA until 1979 when it became completely independent, although it still has close links to both the FDA and the USDA.

Full membership was limited to government analytical chemists until 1987 when membership was extended to industrial scientists. As well as government agencies, members, volunteers and partners now also include people from academia, other international organizations, private laboratories, contract research organizations, instrument manufacturers and rapid assay developers.

Activities

AOAC International's technical contributions center on the creation, validation, and global publication of reliable analytical test methods. Their areas of focus include, but are not limited to, safety of foods, beverages, dietary supplements, fertilizers, animal feeds, soil and water, and veterinary drugs. The aim of the test methods is to evaluate the purity of materials used in the production of foodstuffs, and their ingredients. The development of these analytical methods in achieved as part of a range of programs operated by AOAC.

Core Programs

Official Methods of Analysis
The Official Methods of Analysis (OMA) program is AOAC's premier program for developing food testing analytical science methods that are recognized and legally defensible worldwide.

AOAC Research Institute
AOAC Research Institute (AOAC RI) Performance Tested Methods program develops, improves, and validates proprietary kit-based food safety testing methods.

Laboratory Proficiency Testing Program
Laboratory Proficiency Testing Program (LPTP) helps labs compete in the global marketplace by demonstrating that through participation they meet the highest international standards for accuracy, reliability, and compliance.

Science and Professional Support Programs

Cannabis Analytical Science Program
Cannabis Analytical Science Program (CASP) is a forum where the science of hemp and cannabis analysis can be discussed and cannabis standards and methods developed.

Food Authenticity Methods
Food Authenticity Methods (FAM) program focuses on identifying analytical tools to better characterize the intentional and economically motivated adulteration of foods.

Analytical Solutions Forum
Analytical Solutions Forum (ASF) brings global stakeholders together to identify emerging needs and technologies in scientific analysis of food and related products.

Stakeholder Program on Infant Formula and Adult Nutritionals
Stakeholder Program on Infant Formula and Adult Nutritionals program (SPIFAN) develops consensus-based standards and methods to make infant formula and adult nutritionals safer for babies and adults to consume.

Stakeholder Program on Agent Detection Assays
Stakeholder Program on Agent Detection Assays (SPADA) brings together expert stakeholders from the biothreat community to foster a comprehensive and uniform approach to scientific analysis and detection of biothreat agents.

Analytical International Methods & Standards
Analytical International Methods & Standards (AIMS) program focuses on capability gaps in laboratory testing, emerging microbial threats to food safety, and developing standards for using cutting-edge technologies.

Gluten & Food Allergens
Gluten & Food Allergens (GFA) program focuses on coordinating all future consensus-driven need for development, validation, and implementation of methods for the analysis of a wide range of food-associated allergens and gluten.

Training & Education
Training & Education program offers scientific, regulatory, and professional development training courses in person at the Annual Meeting and Midyear Meeting and as online courses and webinars.

Meetings 
AOAC International holds an Annual Meeting & Conference, typically held in August or September of each year, which is moved around the United States and held in major cities. In addition, a mid-year meeting is held every March near the headquarters in Rockville, Maryland.

Sections
AOAC International has 18 active sections; eight in North America, and ten in the rest of the world, China, India, Japan, Southeast Asia (excluding Thailand), Taiwan, Thailand, Europe (excluding Belgium, Netherlands, and Luxembourg), the Low Countries, Sub-Saharan Africa, and Latin America and the Caribbean.

Publications

AOAC has published the peer-reviewed Journal of AOAC International bimonthly since 1915. They also publish the Official Methods of Analysis (OMA) in hard copy and through the on-line database. The magazine Inside Laboratory Management is published bimonthly for members.

Awards 
At its annual meeting, AOAC presents a range of awards for scientific excellence in standards development and for exceptional service to the association (including fellow). The association's highest honors include:

 The Harvey W. Wiley Award
 The William Horwitz Award

References

Analytical chemistry
Food technology organizations
Non-profit organizations based in Maryland
International scientific organizations
Agricultural organizations based in the United States